The Central District of Kuhrang County is in Chaharmahal and Bakhtiari province, Iran. At the 2006 census, its population was 19,198 in 3,521 households. The following census in 2011 counted 18,219 people in 3,999 households. At the latest census in 2016, the district had 20,222 inhabitants living in 5,295 households.

Gallery

References 

Kuhrang County

Districts of Chaharmahal and Bakhtiari Province

Populated places in Chaharmahal and Bakhtiari Province

Populated places in Kuhrang County